The 4th South Indian International Movie Awards was held in Dubai World Trade Center, Dubai on 6th and 7 August 2015. SIIMA 2015 recognized the best films and performances from the past year, along with special honors for lifetime contributions and a few special awards.

Honorary awards

Lifetime Achievement Award 
 Bharathiraja
 KPAC Lalitha

Special appreciation 
 Dhanush – Pride of South Indian cinema

Main awards 
List of Nominations & Award Winners

Film

Acting

Critics awards

Debut awards

Music 

{| class="wikitable" |
|-
! colspan="2" ! style="background:#eedd82; width:3000px; text-align:center;"|Best Music Director
|-
! ! style="background:#efac00; width:50%; text-align:center;"|Tamil
! ! style="background:#efeb00; text-align:center;"|Telugu
|-
| valign="top" |
Anirudh Ravichander – Velaiyilla Pattathari
D. Imman – Rummy
A. R. Rahman – Kaaviya Thalaivan
Ghibran – Thirumanam Enum Nikkah
Santhosh Narayanan – Madras
| valign="top" |
Anoop Rubens – Manam
S. Thaman – Race Gurram
Ghibran – Run Raja Run
Devi Sri Prasad – 1: Nenokkadine
Mickey J. Meyer – Mukunda
|-
! ! style="background:#00def3; text-align:center;"| Kannada
! ! style="background:#4df300; text-align:center;"| Malayalam
|-
|
V. Harikrishna – Mr. and Mrs. Ramachari
Anoop Seelin – Love in Mandya
Arjun Janya– Maanikya
B. Ajaneesh Loknath – Ulidavaru Kandanthe
Mani Sharma – Ninnindale
| 
Gopi Sunder – Bangalore Days
Bijibal – Vikramadithyan
Shaan Rahman – Om Shanti Oshana
Deepak Dev – Avathaaram
K. Raghavan – Balyakalasakhi
|-
! colspan="2" ! style="background:#eedd82; text-align:center;"|Best Lyricist
|-
! ! style="background:#efac00; text-align:center;"|Tamil
! ! style="background:#efeb00; text-align:center;"|Telugu
|-
| valign="top" |
Dhanush – "Amma Amma" from Velaiyilla Pattathari
Vairamuthu – "Kandangi Kandangi" from Jilla
Na. Muthukumar – "Azhagu" from Saivam
Kabilan – "Vinmeen Vithaiyil" from Thegidi
Yugabharathi – "Manasula Soora Kaathey" from Cuckoo
| valign="top" |
Chandrabose – "Kani Penchina" from Manam 
Sirivennela – "Nandalala" from Mukunda
Ramajogayya Sastry – "Nee Kanti Choopullo" from Legend
Ananta Sriram – "Em Sandeham Ledu" from Oohalu Gusagusalade
Vanamali – "Sari Povu Koti" from Karthikeya
|-
! ! style="background:#00def3; text-align:center;"| Kannada
! ! style="background:#4df300; text-align:center;"| Malayalam
|-
|
Ghouse Peer – "Kaarmoda" from Mr. and Mrs. Ramachari' 
Kaviraj  – "Guruvara Sanje" from Power ***
Santhosh Anandram – "Yaralli Sound" from Mr. and Mrs. Ramachari
Rakshit Shetty– "Gaatiya Ilidu" from Ulidavaru Kandanthe
K. Kalyan – "Kannada Siri" from Gajakesari
| Hari Narayanan– "Olanjaali Kuruvi" from 1983Jayageetha – "Koottu Thedi" from VarshamRafeeq Ahammed – "Ethu Kari Ravilum" from Bangalore DaysAnwar Ali – "Theruvukal Nee" from Njan Steve LopezSanthosh Varma – "Mazha Nila" from Vikramadithyan|-
! colspan="2" ! style="background:#eedd82; text-align:center;"|Best Male Playback Singer
|-
! ! style="background:#efac00; text-align:center;"|Tamil
! ! style="background:#efeb00; text-align:center;"|Telugu
|-
| valign="top" |
Pradeep Kumar – "Aagayam Thee Pidicha" from Madras
Karthik – "Ovvondrai Thirudigirai" from JeevaShadab Faridi – "Enthaara Enthaara" from Thirumanam Enum NikkahAbhay Jodhpurkar – "Vinmeen Vithayil" from ThegidiDhanush – "Amma Amma" from Velaiyilla Pattathari| valign="top" |
Simha – "Cinema Chupista Maava" from Race Gurram
Arijit Singh – "Kanulanu Thake" from ManamMaster Bharath – "Kanipenchina Maa Ammake" from ManamDevi Sri Prasad – "Who Are You" from 1: NenokkadineGold Devaraj – "Bujjimaa" from Run Raja Run|-
! ! style="background:#00def3; text-align:center;"| Kannada
! ! style="background:#4df300; text-align:center;"| Malayalam
|-
|
Rajesh Krishnan – "Kaarmoda" from Mr. and Mrs. Ramachari
Vijay Prakash– "Open Hairu" from AdyakshaGurukiran – "Pesalagi Order" from BrahmaSanthosh Venky – "Aaramagiri Subbalakshmi" from BahaddurAnoop Seelin – "Opkondbitlu Kanla" from Love in Mandya| 
Vineeth Sreenivasan – "Kattu Mooliyo" from Om Shanti Oshana
Job Kurien – "Thane Pookkum" from Sapthamashree ThaskarahaP. Jayachandran – "Olanjali Kuruvi" from 1983Haricharan – "Ethu Kari Ravilum" from Bangalore DaysSiddharth Menon – "Theruvukal Nee" from Njan Steve Lopez|-
! colspan="2" ! style="background:#eedd82; text-align:center;"|Best Female Playback Singer
|-
! ! style="background:#efac00; text-align:center;"|Tamil
! ! style="background:#efeb00; text-align:center;"|Telugu
|-
| valign="top" |
Uthara Unnikrishnan – "Azhaghu" from Saivam
Shreya Ghoshal – "Yen Aala Pakkaporen" from KhayalShweta Mohan – "Yaarumilla" from Kaaviya ThalaivanShakthisree Gopalan – "Naan Nee" from MadrasVani Jayaram – "Narayana Narayana" from Ramanujan| valign="top" |
Neha Bhasin – "Aww Thujo Mogh Korta" from 1: Nenokkadine
Shreya Ghoshal – "Chinni Chinni Aasalu" from ManamShreya Ghoshal – "Nee Jathaga Nenundali" from YevaduK. S. Chithra– "Gopikamma" from MukundaChinmayi – "Vaddantune" from Run Raja Run|-
! ! style="background:#00def3; text-align:center;"| Kannada
! ! style="background:#4df300; text-align:center;"| Malayalam
|-
|
Sinchan Dixit– "Current Hoda Timealli" from Love in Mandya
Apoorva Sridhar – "Aaramagiri Subbulakshmi" from BahaddurAnuradha Bhat – "Neenu Iruvaga" from NinnindaleHamsika Iyer – "Ninna Danigagi" from Savaari 2Shreya Ghoshal – "Kannale" from Ambareesha| 
Sithara – "Saada Paalaya" from Mr. Fraud
Shreya Ghoshal – "Vijanathayil" from How Old Are YouSowmya T R – "Mazhanila" from VikramadithyanShweta Mohan – "Onnam Kombathe" from OttamandaramPreeti Pillai – "Solomonum Soshannayum" from Amen|}

 Choreography 

 Generation Next Awards 

 Stylish Youth Icon of South Indian Cinema (male) – Allu Arjun
 Stylish Youth Icon of South Indian Cinema (female) – Amy Jackson
 Most Romantic Star of South Indian Cinema – Bharath Srinivasan
 Most Popular Actress Middle East – Asin Thottumkal
 Most Streamed Song Award :
Tamil – Anirudh Ravichander – Selfie Pulla – 
Telugu – S. Thaman – Aagadu – Title song
Kannada – S. Thaman – Power *** – "Guruvara Sanje"
Malayalam – Shaan Rahman – Om Shanti Oshana'' – "Kattu Mooliyo"

References

External links
 Official website
 

South Indian International Movie Awards
2015 Indian film awards